Sergio Osagho Uyi (born 22 June 1993) is an Nigerian-Italian professional footballer who most recently played as a centre-back for Seregno.

Career
In 2006, Uyi joined the youth academy of Italian third tier side Canavese. In 2011, he joined the youth academy of Torino in the Italian Serie A. Before the 2014 season, he signed for Lithuanian club Dainava after trialing for Slavia Prague in the Czech top flight. In 2015, he signed for Finnish third tier team Atlantis FC. Before the second half of 2015–16, he signed for SSV Reutlingen in the German fifth tier. Before the second half of 2016–17, he signed for Welsh outfit Bangor City. 

In 2017, Uyi signed for Senglea Athletic in Malta. In 2018, he signed for Sudanese side Al-Hilal (Omdurman), helping them win the league. Before the second half of 2018–19, he signed for Poli Timișoara in Romania. In 2019, Uyi signed for Omani club Al-Orouba. Before the second half of 2020–21, he returned to Senglea Athletic in Malta. Before the second half of 2021–22, he signed for Italian team Seregno after trialing for SLNA in Vietnam. On 13 February 2022, Uyi debuted for Seregno during a 2–1 loss to Padova.

References

External links
Sergio Uyi at playmakerstats.com

Living people
1993 births
Italian people of Nigerian descent
Nigerian footballers
Italian footballers
Association football defenders
A Lyga players
Kakkonen players
Cymru Premier players
Maltese Premier League players
Sudan Premier League players
Liga II players
Oman Professional League players
Serie C players
FK Dainava Alytus players
Atlantis FC players
SSV Reutlingen 05 players
Bangor City F.C. players
Senglea Athletic F.C. players
Al-Hilal Club (Omdurman) players
ACS Poli Timișoara players
Al-Orouba SC players
U.S. 1913 Seregno Calcio players
Italian expatriate footballers
Italian expatriate sportspeople in Lithuania
Expatriate footballers in Lithuania
Italian expatriate sportspeople in Finland
Expatriate footballers in Finland
Italian expatriate sportspeople in Germany
Expatriate footballers in Germany
Italian expatriate sportspeople in Wales
Expatriate footballers in Wales
Italian expatriate sportspeople in Malta
Expatriate footballers in Malta
Italian expatriate sportspeople in Sudan
Expatriate footballers in Sudan
Italian expatriate sportspeople in Romania
Expatriate footballers in Romania
Italian expatriate sportspeople in Oman
Expatriate footballers in Oman